Bilyi Kolodiaz is an urban-type settlement in Chuhuiv Raion of Kharkiv Oblast in Ukraine. It is located at the northeast of the oblast, in the drainage basin of the Donets. Bilyi Kolodiaz belongs to Vovchansk urban hromada, one of the hromadas of Ukraine. Population: 

Until 18 July 2020, Bilyi Kolodiaz belonged to Vovchansk Raion. The raion was abolished in July 2020 as part of the administrative reform of Ukraine, which reduced the number of raions of Kharkiv Oblast to seven. The area of Vovchansk Raion was merged into Chuhuiv Raion.

Economy

Transportation
Bilyi Kolodiaz railway station in on the railway connecting Vovchansk and Kupiansk. There is infrequent passenger traffic.

The settlement has road connections with Vovchansk and with Prykolotne.

References

Urban-type settlements in Chuhuiv Raion
Volchansky Uyezd